The taekwondo tournament at the 2018 Summer Youth Olympics was held between 7 and 11 October in Buenos Aires, Argentina.

100 athletes participated in the tournament, that took place at the Parque Polideportivo Roca in Buenos Aires.

Qualification

Summary

Men's events

Women's events

Medal table

Medallists

Boys

Girls

References

External links
Official Results Book – Taekwondo

 
2018 Summer Youth Olympics events
2018 in taekwondo
Taekwondo in Argentina